The 2017 Fukuoka International Women's Cup was a professional tennis tournament played on outdoor carpet courts. It was the seventeenth edition of the tournament and part of the 2017 ITF Women's Circuit, offering a total of $60,000 in prize money. It took place in Fukuoka, Japan, from 8–14 May 2017.

Point distribution

Singles main draw entrants

Seeds 

 1 Rankings as of 1 May 2017

Other entrants 
The following players received wildcards into the singles main draw:
  Rika Fujiwara
  Momoko Kobori
  Ayumi Miyamoto
  Aiko Yoshitomi

The following players received entry into the singles main draw by a protected ranking:
  Kimberly Birrell
  Magdaléna Rybáriková

The following players received entry from the qualifying draw:
  Monique Adamczak
  Nagi Hanatani
  Erina Hayashi
  Yukina Saigo

Champions

Singles

 Magdaléna Rybáriková def.  Jang Su-jeong, 6–2, 6–3

Doubles

 Junri Namigata /  Kotomi Takahata def.  Erina Hayashi /  Robu Kajitani, 6–0, 6–7(3–7), [10–7]

External links 
 2017 Fukuoka International Women's Cup at ITFtennis.com
 Official website

2017 in Japanese women's sport
2017 ITF Women's Circuit
2017
2017 in Japanese tennis